This is a list of châteaux in the French region of Normandy.

Lower Normandy

Calvados 
Château d'Ailly in Bernières-d'Ailly
Balleroy Castle in Balleroy
Château de Beaumont-le-Richard in Englesqueville-la-Percée private
Château de Bénouville in Bénouville
Château de Brécy in Saint-Gabriel-Brécy
Château du Breuil, in Breuil-en-Auge
Château les Bruyères in Cambremer
Château de Caen in Caen
Château de Canon in Mézidon-Canon
Château de Colombières in Colombières private, open to visitors
Château de Courcy in Courcy private
Château de Creully in Creully
Château de Falaise in Falaise
Château de Fontaine-Henry in Fontaine-Henry
Château de Guernon-Ranville in Ranville
Château de Lion-sur-Mer in Lion-sur-Mer
Château d'Olivet in Grimbosq
Château de La Pommeraye in La Pommeraye
Château du Neubourg in Saint-Marcouf, Calvados
Château de Pontécoulant in Pontécoulant
Château de Saint-Germain-de-Livet in Saint-Germain-de-Livet
Château de Tournebu in Tournebu
Château de Vendeuvre in Vendeuvre
Château de Versainville in Versainville
Château de Vire in Vire

Manche 
Château d'Amfreville in Amfreville, private
La Bastille in Beuzeville-la-Bastille, ruined
Hôtel de Beaumont (town residence) in Valognes, private, open to visitors
Château de Bricquebec in Bricquebec, owned by local authority, open to visitors
Manoir de Brion in Dragey-Ronthon private
Le Câtelet (castle motte) in Beuzeville-la-Bastille
Château de Chanteloup in Chanteloup, private
Château de Charuel in Sacey private
Manoir de Coutainville in Agon-Coutainville private
Château de Crosville in Crosville-sur-Douve private, open to visitors
Château de Ganne in La Haye-Pesnel, ruined, site may be freely visited
Château de Gavray in Gavray, private, site may be freely visited
Manoir de Graffard in Barneville-Carteret, private, exterior may be seen
Château de Gratot in Gratot private, open to visitors
Château de la Mare in Jullouville, private
Manoir de Mesnil-Vitey in Airel, private
Château des Montgommery in Ducey, partially demolished, partially private, open to visitors
Château de la Palluelle in Saint-James, private
Château de Pirou in Pirou private, open to visitors
Château de Plain-Marais in Beuzeville-la-Bastille, private
Château de Querqueville in Querqueville, owned by local authority, open to visitors (town hall)
Château des Ravalet with botanic gardens in Tourlaville, Cherbourg-Octeville, owned by local authority, open to visitors
Château de Regnéville in Regnéville-sur-Mer, open to visitors
Château de Rochemont in Saussemesnil, private
Château de la Roche-Tesson in La Colombe, ruined, private
Château des Ruettes in Blainville-sur-Mer, private
Château de Saint-Pair in Saint-Pair, disappeared
Manoir de Saint-Ortaire, au Dézert private
Château du Tourps in Anneville-en-Saire, vestiges of the feudal manor, 18th-century château, private, visible from outside
Manoir de Vauville and its botanical gardens in Vauville, private, open to visitors

Orne 
Manoir de la Bérardière in Saint-Bômer-les-Forges
Château du Bourg-Saint-Léonard at Bourg-Saint-Léonard
Château de Carrouges in Carrouges
Donjon de Chambois in Chambois
Château de Couterne in Couterne
Château de Domfront in Domfront
Château des Ducs d'Alençon in Alençon
Château des ducs in Argentan
Château de Flers in Flers
Château de La Fresnaye in La Fresnaye-au-Sauvage. Birthplace of Nicolas Vauquelin Des Yveteaux (1567–1649), French poet.
Château de Marchainville in Marchainville
Château de Médavy in Médavy
Château de Messei in Messei
Château de la Motte, Joué du Plain
Château d'Ô in Mortrée
Château du Repas in Chênedouit
Château de Sassy in Saint-Christophe-le-Jajolet
Château de Villiers in Essay
Château de Vimer in Guerquesalles

Upper Normandy

Eure 
 Château d'Acquigny in Acquigny
 Tour des Archives in Vernon
 Château de Beaumesnil in Beaumesnil
 Château de Bizy in Vernon
 Château de Bonnemare in Radepont
 Château de Bonneville, in Chamblac
 Château de Brécourt in Douains
 Château du Buisson de May in Saint Aquilin de Pacy
 Château du Champ de Bataille, in Neubourg
 Château Gaillard, in Andelys
 Château-sur-Epte Castle in Château-sur-Epte
 Château de Conches-en-Ouche in Conches-en-Ouche
 Château de Fleury-la-Forêt in Fleury-la-Forêt
 Château de Gaillon in Gaillon
 Château de Gisors in Gisors
 Château d'Harcourt in Harcourt
 Château de Houlbec-près-le-Gros-Theil in Houlbec-près-le-Gros-Theil
 Château d'Ivry-la-Bataille in Ivry-la-Bataille
 Fort de Limaie in Igoville
 Château de la Madeleine in Pressagny-l'Orgueilleux
 Château de Montaure in Montaure
 Château de Petiteville
 Château du Plessis-Bouquelon in Bouquelon
 Château Sainte-Marie in Vernon
 Château de Saint-Gervais in St Gervais
 Château de Saint-Just in Saint-Just
 Château de Tilly in Boissey-le-Châtel
 Château des Tourelles in Vernon
 Château de Vascœuil in Vascœuil
 Château de Verneuil-sur-Avre in Verneuil-sur-Avre

Seine-Maritime 
 Manoir d'Ango in Varengeville-sur-Mer
 Château d'Arques-la-Bataille in Arques-la-Bataille
 Manoir d'Auffay in Oherville
 Château de Bailleul in Angerville-Bailleul
 Château du Bosc Théroulde in Bosc-Guérard-Saint-Adrien
 Château de Bosmelet in Auffay
 Château de Cany in Cany-Barville
 Manoir du Catel in Écretteville-lès-Baons
 Château de Dieppe in Dieppe
 Château d'Ételan in Saint-Maurice-d'Ételan
 Château d'Eu in Eu
 Château de Fécamp in Fécamp
 Château de Filières in Gommerville
 Château de Galleville in Doudeville
 Château du Manais in Ferrières-en-Bray
 Château de Martainville in Martainville-Épreville
 Château de Mauny in Mauny
 Château de Mesnières in Mesnières-en-Bray
 Château de Miromesnil in Tourville-sur-Arques
 Château d'Orcher in Gonfreville-l'Orcher
 Manoir de Pierre Corneille in Petit-Couronne
 Château de la Rivière-Bourdet in Quevillon
 Château de Robert-le-Diable in Moulineaux
 Château de Rouen et Tour Jeanne d'Arc, in Rouen
° Chateau de Sommesnil in Sommesnil
 Château du Taillis in Duclair
 Château de Tancarville in Tancarville
 Château du Val des Leux in Mauny
 Château du Vaudroc in Limpiville
 Manoir de Villers in Saint-Pierre-de-Manneville
 Château d'Yville in Yville-sur-Seine

Notes and references 

Les châteaux de Normandie at Paris-Normandie.fr

See also

 List of castles in France

 Normandy
Châteaux in Normandy
Châteaux